This is a list of episodes for Nickelodeon's animated television series, The Penguins of Madagascar. As of December 19, 2015, 149 original episodes have aired, with most of the episodes to date being aired in pairs. Aside from eight double-length specials and one quadruple-length special, the running time for each episode is 11 minutes.

Series overview

Episodes

Season 1 (2008–10)

Season 2 (2010–12)

Season 3 (2012–15)

Home media 

 Note: The first two volumes Operation: DVD Premiere and Happy King Julien Day! were released in both regions one and four.

References 

 General references that apply to most episodes
 
 

Penguins
Penguins